Golf Leopards is a Sierra Leonean football club from Freetown, Sierra Leone. They currently play in the Sierra Leone National Premier League, the top football league in Sierra League.

Football clubs in Sierra Leone
Sport in Freetown